Halwell Camp is an Iron Age hill fort situated close to the village of Halwell in Devon, England. The fort is situated on a pass between two hilltops to the east of the village at approx 185 metres above sea level.

References

Hill forts in Devon